Kairana Lok Sabha constituency is one of the 80 Lok Sabha (parliamentary) constituencies in the Indian state of Uttar Pradesh.

Vidhan Sabha Segments
Presently, Kairana Lok Sabha constituency comprises five Vidhan Sabha (legislative assembly) segments. These are:

Members of Lok Sabha

^ by-poll

Election Results

2019 Lok Sabha Elections

2018 bye-election

General election 1996

2014 Lok Sabha Elections

2004 Lok Sabha Elections

1999 Lok Sabha Elections
 Amir Alam (RLD) : 206,345 votes    
 Niranjan Singh Malik (BJP) : 168,073

See also
 Shamli district
 List of Constituencies of the Lok Sabha

Notes

Lok Sabha constituencies in Uttar Pradesh
Politics of Muzaffarnagar district